Ali Sadr Rural District is a rural district (dehestan) in Gol Tappeh District, Kabudarahang County, Hamadan Province, Iran. At the 2006 census, its population was 6,872, in 1,486 families. The rural district has 15 villages.

References 

Rural Districts of Hamadan Province
Kabudarahang County